Om Birla (born 23 November 1962) is an Indian politician, agriculturist and social worker who is the 17th and current Speaker of the Lok Sabha. He serves as a Member of Parliament from Kota-Bundi constituency in Rajasthan. Prior to parliament, he was elected thrice to the assembly of Rajasthan. He is a member of the Bharatiya Janata Party.

Early life 
Om Birla was born on 23 November 1962, to Shrikrishna Birla and Shakuntala Devi in a Marwari Hindu Maheshwari family. He completed his master's degree in commerce from Govt. Commerce College, Kota and Maharshi Dayanand Saraswati University, Ajmer. He married  Amita Birla in 1991 and has two daughters Akansha and Anjali.

Political career

Legislative Assembly 
Om Birla won his first assembly elections contesting from Kota South in 2003. He defeated Shanti Dhariwal from Congress by a margin of 10,101 votes. In the next assembly elections, he defended his seat with a comfortable margin of 24,300 votes to his nearest candidate Ram Kishan Verma from Congress in 2008. Before becoming a Member of Parliament, he won his third assembly election against Pankaj Mehta (Congress) by close to 50,000 votes in 2013. During his tenure in 2003–08, he was the Parliamentary Secretary (MoS rank) in Rajasthan Government.

Member of Parliament 
As the BJP candidate for the Kota constituency Om Birla was elected to the 16th & 17th Lok Sabha.

In the 16th Lok Sabha, he was a member of the Standing Committee on Energy and Consultative Committee for the Ministry of Social Justice and Empowerment.

Selection of the Kota-Bundi MP, Om Birla for the post of the Lok Sabha speaker surprised many including MPs from the treasury bench.

Speaker of the Lok Sabha 

On the 19 June 2019 Om Birla was elected Speaker of the 17th Lok Sabha, following a motion for election moved by Prime Minister Modi of the Bharatiya Janata Party. The Congress and the Dravida Munnetra Kazhagam parties also moved notices for Birla and urged him to be impartial as presiding officer of the Lower House. The parliamentary convention for the Republic of India is for the Deputy Speaker of the Lok Sabha to come from the Opposition benches. As of March 2021, uniquely in the history of the Republic, the Lok Sabha approaches two years of a vacant Deputy Speaker seat.

Posts held 
 District President, Bhartiya Janta Yuva Morcha, Kota. (1987–91)
 State President, Bhartiya Janta Yuva Morcha, Rajasthan State. (1991–1997)
 National Vice President, Bhartiya Janta Yuva Morcha. (1997–2003)
 MLA From Kota South(2003-2015)
 Member of Parliament from Kota(2014-Present)
 Vice Chairman, National Co-operative Consumer Federation Limited.
 Chairman, CONFED, Jaipur. (June 1992 to June 1995)
 Lok Sabha Speaker, (19 June 2019 to present)

References

External links
 Official biographical sketch in Parliament of India website

|-

|-

Living people
Rajasthan MLAs 2013–2018
1962 births
India MPs 2014–2019
Lok Sabha members from Rajasthan
Bharatiya Janata Party politicians from Rajasthan
People from Kota, Rajasthan
India MPs 2019–present
Speakers of the Lok Sabha